USS Clemson may refer to the following ships operated by the United States:

  was a  launched in 1918 and sold in 1946
  was a planned Forward Depot Ship but the program was canceled in 1966

United States Navy ship names